Wayne Hewitson "Weiner" Brown (November 16, 1930 – September 20, 2019) was a Canadian professional ice hockey right winger. Although he never played in a regular season National Hockey League (NHL) game, he did play in four playoff games for the Boston Bruins in the 1953–54 season.

Career statistics

Regular season and playoffs

International

References

External links
 

1930 births
2019 deaths
Boston Bruins players
Canadian expatriate ice hockey players in the United States
Canadian ice hockey right wingers
Clinton Comets players
Ice hockey people from Ontario
Ontario Hockey Association Senior A League (1890–1979) players
Seattle Totems (WHL) players
St. Catharines Teepees players
Sportspeople from Belleville, Ontario
Tacoma Rockets (WHL) players
Vancouver Canucks (WHL) players
Victoria Cougars (1949–1961) players